Mary Bennett may refer to:
 Mary Bennett (academic) (1913–2005), British academic, principal of St Hilda's College, Oxford 
 Mary Bennett (lighthouse keeper) (1816–1885), lighthouse keeper in New Zealand
 Mary Montgomerie Bennett (1881–1961), Australian activist
 Mary L. Bennett (born 1942), American artist